Imen Mchara (born 15 February 1995) is a Tunisian footballer who plays as a striker for AF Sousse and the Tunisia women's national team.

Club career
Mchara has played for Sousse in Tunisia.

International career

.

International goals
Scores and results list Tunisia's goal tally first

See also
List of Tunisia women's international footballers

References

External links

1995 births
Living people
Tunisian women's footballers
Women's association football forwards
Tunisia women's international footballers
20th-century Tunisian women
21st-century Tunisian women